North Nazimabad Town lies in the northern part of the city that was named after the suburb of North Nazimabad. North Nazimabad Town was formed in 2001 as part of The Local Government Ordinance 2001, and was subdivided into 10 union councils and North Nazimabad Town was re-organized as part of Karachi Central District in 2015. 

In January 2022, the town system was restored by a Government of Sindh notification dividing Karachi into 26 towns and 233 union councils.

History

2000 
The federal government introduced local government reforms in the year 2000, which eliminated the previous "third tier of government" (administrative divisions) and replaced it with the fourth tier (districts). The effect in Karachi was the dissolution of the former Karachi Division, and the merging of its five districts to form a new Karachi City-District with eighteen autonomous constituent towns including North Nazimabad Town.

2011 
In 2011, the system was disbanded but remained in place for bureaucratic administration until 2015, when the Karachi Metropolitan Corporation system was reintroduced.

2015 
In 2015, North Nazimabad Town was re-organized as part of Karachi Central district.

Demography
Muhajirs form the majority of north nazimabad's population. There are several minority ethnic groups in North Nazimabad including:Bohras, Ismailis, Kutchis, Punjabis, and Pakhtuns.

See also 
Karachi
 North Nazimabad

References

External links

 
Karachi Central District
Towns in Karachi